= Vijaypal Baghel =

Indian environmental activist

Vijaypal Baghel is an Indian environmental activist who saved more than one million trees. In 2020, India Post and Government of India honored him by issuing stamp on him. He is popularly known as "Green man of India".
